Equus lenensis, the Lena horse, is an extinct species of horse from the Pleistocene of Siberia. A notable Lena horse specimen was found in Batagaika crater in Russia which was preserved almost completely intact, and with liquid blood within its preserved veins.

References 

Extinct species
Extinct animals of Russia
Equus (genus)